Crockerhill is a hamlet in south Hampshire, England. The population at the 2011 Census was included in the Borough of Fareham

References

Villages in Hampshire